Jean Stéphane Achy (born 11 July 1988) is a Gabonese footballer who plays as a midfielder for Missile FC.

He made his debut for the Gabon national team in 2009.

References

1988 births
Living people
Gabonese footballers
Gabon international footballers
Association football midfielders
FC 105 Libreville players
AS Mangasport players
Sportspeople from Libreville
AS Pélican players
21st-century Gabonese people